Montgomery Township is a township in Franklin County, Pennsylvania, United States. The population was 5,740 at the 2020 census, up from 4,949 at the 2000 census.

History
The township has the name of Richard Montgomery, a general in the American Revolution.

Mansfield, Robert Kennedy Memorial Presbyterian Church, Hays Bridge Historic District, Angle Farm, Millmont Farm, Rock Hill Farm, and the Col. John Work House are listed on the National Register of Historic Places.

Geography
The township is in southwestern Franklin County, bordered to the south by Washington County, Maryland. The western border of the township follows the ridgecrest of Cove Mountain, the eastern border follows Conococheague Creek in part, and the southern border is part of the Mason–Dixon line. The borough of Mercersburg lies along part of the northern edge of the township.

Two Top Mountain, Claylick Mountain, Kasies Knob, and Rickard Mountain, all part of the Bear Pond Mountains, are in the southern part of the township. Whitetail Ski Resort is on the eastern side of Two Top Mountain.

Pennsylvania Route 75 crosses the center of the township, leading north into Mercersburg and south to the Maryland border. Pennsylvania Route 16 crosses the northern part of the township, leading northwest into Mercersburg and east to Greencastle. Unincorporated communities in the township include Kasiesville, Claylick and Shimpstown along PA 75. Welsh Run is in the eastern part of the township, and Nova is in the southeast.

Neighboring townships

  Antrim Township (east)
  Peters Township (north)
  Warren Township (west)

Communities

  Bino
  Claylick
  Kasiesville
  Lenwood Heights
  Nova
  Shimpstown
  Welsh Run

Demographics

As of the census of 2000, there were 4,949 people, 1,782 households, and 1,448 families residing in the township.  The population density was 73.8 people per square mile (28.5/km2).  There were 1,849 housing units at an average density of 27.6/sq mi (10.6/km2).  The racial makeup of the township was 99.23% White, 0.24% African American, 0.12% Native American, 0.06% Asian, 0.16% from other races, and 0.18% from two or more races. Hispanic or Latino of any race were 0.44% of the population.

There were 1,782 households, out of which 35.5% had children under the age of 18 living with them, 72.2% were married couples living together, 4.0% had a female householder with no husband present, and 18.7% were non-families. 15.0% of all households were made up of individuals, and 5.7% had someone living alone who was 65 years of age or older.  The average household size was 2.78 and the average family size was 3.07.

In the township the population was spread out, with 25.7% under the age of 18, 7.2% from 18 to 24, 31.0% from 25 to 44, 26.3% from 45 to 64, and 9.8% who were 65 years of age or older.  The median age was 37 years. For every 100 females there were 109.8 males.  For every 100 females age 18 and over, there were 106.2 males.

The median income for a household in the township was $47,538, and the median income for a family was $50,653. Males had a median income of $31,364 versus $23,775 for females. The per capita income for the township was $18,699.  About 3.7% of families and 7.0% of the population were below the poverty line, including 9.5% of those under age 18 and 10.3% of those age 65 or over.

References

Populated places established in 1730
Townships in Franklin County, Pennsylvania
1730 establishments in Pennsylvania